John Brown (15 October 1887 – 6 December 1943) was a Scottish professional footballer who played as an outside-left.

Club career
Brown signed for Celtic in 1911 from Falkirk. His career in Glasgow started well, and he was nominated for the Scottish Football League XI for a game against The Football League XI.

He was loaned to English side Chelsea in 1912, and made the switch permanent a year later. He made a total of sixteen appearances for The Blues, scoring four goals.

References

1887 births
1943 deaths
Scottish footballers
Association football forwards
Clackmannan F.C. players
Hearts of Beath F.C. players
Alloa Athletic F.C. players
Falkirk F.C. players
Celtic F.C. players
Chelsea F.C. players
Raith Rovers F.C. players
Dunfermline Athletic F.C. players
Lochgelly United F.C. players